Le Trident is a group of three theatres in the city of Cherbourg-Octeville, within the Manche department of Normandy, in northern France.

The theatres were made a 'scène nationale' on 14 October 2002, after the merger of the Théâtre de Cherbourg-Scène Nationale and the Théâtre de la Butte-CCPO.

Theatres
The three theatres are:
 Théâtre à l'italienne — in Cherbourg district
 Théâtre de la Butte — in Octeville district
 Vox Théâtre — in Cherbourg-Octeville

See also

External links
 Trident-sn.com: official Le Trident theatres website

Theatres in France
Le Trident
Buildings and structures in Manche
Le Trident